Jerry Hardin (born November 20, 1929) is an American actor. Hardin has appeared in film and television roles, including the character nicknamed Deep Throat in The X-Files.

Hardin was born in Texas and studied acting at London's Royal Academy of Dramatic Art before beginning his acting career in New York. He is married with two children, one of whom is actress Melora Hardin.

Early life and education
Hardin was born in Dallas on November 20, 1929. His father was a rancher, and Jerry spent his youth actively involved with his local church and performing in school plays. He attended Southwestern University in Georgetown, Texas, on a scholarship before going on to study at London's Royal Academy of Dramatic Art, earning a scholarship there through the Fulbright Program. He spent several years there before returning to the United States to begin acting in New York, performing in regional theatre for twelve years.

Career
Hardin began acting on television in the 1950s, mostly in character roles. He amassed over a hundred appearances by the early 1990s, in addition to more than seventy-five theatrical credits by the early 1960s. His television appearances include roles in the 1976 western series Sara, Family Ties, The Golden Girls, World War III, Star Trek: The Next Generation, Star Trek: Voyager, Sliders, and Lois & Clark: The New Adventures of Superman. Hardin appeared in such films as Thunder Road (1958), Our Time (1974),The Rockford Files (1977), Chilly Scenes of Winter (1979), 1941 (1979), Reds (1981), Missing (1982), Tempest (1982), Honkytonk Man (1982), Cujo (1983), Mass Appeal (1984), Warning Sign (1985), Big Trouble in Little China (1986), Let's Get Harry (1986), Wanted: Dead or Alive (1987), Little Nikita (1988), The Milagro Beanfield War (1988), Blaze (1989), The Hot Spot (1990), The Firm (1993).

Deep Throat
His role in 1993's The Firm won Hardin the attention of television writer Chris Carter, who cast him in the recurring role of Deep Throat in the series The X-Files. Hardin believed his initial appearance in the second episode of the first season, airing on September 17, 1993, would be a one-time role, but he soon found himself regularly commuting to the series' Vancouver filming location on short notice. After filming the character's death in the first season finale, "The Erlenmeyer Flask", Hardin was toasted with champagne, and told by Carter that "no one ever really dies on X-Files". As such, Hardin made several more appearances as Deep Throat after this, seen in visions in the third season's "The Blessing Way" and the seventh season's "The Sixth Extinction II: Amor Fati", in flashbacks in the fourth season's "Musings of a Cigarette Smoking Man", and as one of the guises assumed by a shapeshifting alien in the third season's finale, "Talitha Cumi".

Personal life
Hardin is married, with two children. His wife Diane (née Hill) is an acting coach. Despite Hardin's claim that he "did my best to discourage my own children from doing it", his daughter Melora Hardin is also an actress, known for roles as Trudy Monk in Monk and Jan Levinson in The Office, and his son Shawn Hardin worked for television studio NBC.

Footnotes

References

External links
 
 
 
 

1929 births
Jerry
American male film actors
American male television actors
Living people
People from Dallas
Male actors from Texas
Southwestern University alumni
Alumni of RADA